Eulepyroniella is a genus of true bugs belonging to the family Aphrophoridae.

Species
Species:

Eulepyroniella apicata 
Eulepyroniella camerunensis 
Eulepyroniella fasciata

References

Aphrophoridae